Wutaishan Stadium (Simplified Chinese: 五台山体育场) is a multi-purpose stadium in Wutaishan Sports Center (Simplified Chinese: 五台山体育中心), Nanjing, China. It is currently used mostly for football matches, as home ground of Jiangsu L.F.C. The stadium has a capacity for 22,000 people.

References

External links 
Wutaishan Sports Center website 

Sports venues in Nanjing
Football venues in Nanjing
Multi-purpose stadiums in China
Venues of the 2014 Summer Youth Olympics
Youth Olympic football venues